Thomas Lodu is a South Sudanese politician. He has served as Commissioner of Juba County, Central Equatoria since 2005.

References

Living people
County Commissioners of South Sudan
People from Central Equatoria
Year of birth missing (living people)
Place of birth missing (living people)
21st-century South Sudanese politicians